Gulyay-gorod, also guliai-gorod (literally: "wandering town"), was a mobile fortification used by the Russian army between the 16th and the 17th centuries.

History and terminology
The use of term gulyay-gorod is noted in sources since the 1530s, during the Russo-Kazan Wars, and it was understood not only as a type of wagon-fort, but also as siege towers. Later, this term could cover mobile barriers like the cheval de frise. It was probably just an adaptation of the German term "wagenburg". At first, it was used to cover artillery during the siege of fortresses. In 1572 gulyay-gorod was very successfully used by the commander Prince Mikhail Vorotynsky in the heavy field battle of Molodi. So in the following years, the use of gulyay-gorod expanded, and pre-made shields were stored not only in the border fortresses, but also near Moscow. For the transportation and equipment of Gulyai-gorod, a special voivode was appointed, who had a separate cavalry detachment for reconnaissance. Giles Fletcher, the Elder, English  ambassador to Russia, left an early Western description of the gulyay-gorod in his Of the Russe Common Wealth (1591).

At the end of the 16th century, the term "gulyai-gorod" was gradually replaced by the term "oboz", literally "wagon train". A Russian eyewitness describes how, during the next invasion of the Crimean Tatars in 1591, Russian troops retreated to Moscow and defended themselves in the "wagon train" — "and by the ancient name - gulyay". At the beginning of the 17th century, another term appeared to denote a mobile fortification - "tabor".

Later the Zaporozhian Cossacks used this type of fortification extensively. In Cossack Hetmanate, Bogdan Khmelnitsky had a large gulyay-gorod built for the siege of the castle of Zbarazh in 1649.

With the proliferation of field artillery this kind of fortification fell into disuse. In a wider sense the Russian term has come to be applied to foreign mobile fortifications, such as wagon forts of Hussites.

Design and tactics
Russian armies would construct a gulyay-gorod from large wall-sized prefabricated shields (with holes for guns) installed on wheels or sleds, as a development of the wagon-fort concept. The usage of installable shields instead of permanently armoured wagons cost less and allowed the assembly of more possible configurations. Gulyay-gorod provided the cavalry with a mobile and impregnable (for the Tatars) shelter. From there, the cavalry could launch surprise attacks. A common technique was fire ambush, when the pursuers were lured by a false retreat under fire from gulyay-gorod, as it was already in 1572.

See also
 Battery-tower
 Wagon fort
 Mantlet
 Gorod

References

Sources
 V. F. Shperk, "The History of Fortification" (В. Ф. Шперк, История фортификации) (1957) 

Fortifications by type
Medieval defences
Russian inventions
Military history of Russia
Fortifications in Russia